Bagnols-en-Forêt is a commune in Var department in the Provence-Alpes-Côte d'Azur region in Southeastern France. In 2019, it had a population of 2,862.

Twin towns — sister cities
Bagnols-en-Forêt is twinned with:

  Pieve di Teco, Italy (1990)

Notable people
Pierre-Jean Porro (1750–1831), classical guitarist, composer and music publisher

See also
Communes of the Var department

References

Communes of Var (department)